Dampoort may refer to:

Dampoort (Ghent)
Dampoort (Bruges)